Sir John Lisle (1366–1408), of Wootton, Isle of Wight and Thruxton, Hampshire was a Member of Parliament for Hampshire in 1401 and January 1404. He was the father of the MP John Lisle.

References

1366 births
1408 deaths
Politicians from the Isle of Wight
15th-century English people
English MPs 1401
English MPs January 1404